Cambridge Algebra System (CAMAL) is a computer algebra system written in Cambridge University by David Barton, Steve Bourne, and John Fitch. It was initially used for computations in celestial mechanics and general relativity. The foundation code was written in Titan computer assembler,.  In 1973, when Titan was replaced with an IBM370/85, it was rewritten in ALGOL 68C and then BCPL where it could run on IBM mainframes and assorted microcomputers.

References

Further reading 

 
 
 

Computer algebra systems